Johan Wilhelm Heunis (born 26 January 1958 in George, Western Cape, South Africa) is a former South African rugby union player.

Playing career
Heunis started his career in Port Elizabeth while studying law at the University of Port Elizabeth (Nelson Mandela Metropolitan University) and made his provincial debut for Eastern Province in 1979. After receiving his call up for his national service in Pretoria, he moved to Pretoria and gained Northern Transvaal colours in 1981.

Heunis made his test debut for the Springboks during the 1981 tour of New Zealand as a replacement for Gysie Pienaar in the third test on 12 September 1981 at Eden Park in Auckland. His first start for the Springboks in a test match was against the USA on 20 September 1981 at the Owl Creek Polo ground in Glenville, New York. Heunis played 14 test matches for the Springboks, scoring 41 points. He played a further 10 tour matches for the Springboks in which he scored 31 points.

Test history 

Legend: pen = penalty (3 pts.); con = conversion (2 pts.), drop = drop kick (3 pts.).

Accolades
Heunis was named the SA Rugby player of the Year for 1989

See also
List of South Africa national rugby union players – Springbok no. 521

References

1958 births
Living people
South African rugby union players
South Africa international rugby union players
Rugby union fullbacks
Blue Bulls players
People from George, South Africa
Rugby union players from the Western Cape